This article lists the confirmed national speedway squads for the 2009 Speedway World Cup tournament held between 11 and 18 July 2009. Squads for the tournament consisted of 10 riders, same as the previous tournament in 2008. Each participating national association had to confirm its 10-rider until one month before first tournament meeting.

















See also 
 2009 Speedway World Cup
 2009 Speedway Grand Prix

References 

!
Speedway riders